Krásná Lípa is a town in Děčín District in the Ústí nad Labem Region of the Czech Republic. It has about 3,400 inhabitants.

Administrative parts
Villages of Dlouhý Důl, Hely, Kamenná Horka, Krásný Buk, Kyjov, Sněžná, Vlčí Hora and Zahrady are administrative parts of Krásná Lípa.

Geography
It lies on the border of three nature regions. Most of the municipal territory lies in the Lusatian Highlands, but it also extends into the Lusatian Mountains in the south and into the Elbe Sandstone Mountains in the west.

Krásná Lípa extends into the Bohemian Switzerland National Park in the west. The headquarters of the national park authority is located in the town.

History
The first written mention of Krásná Lípa is from 1361. About 30 families from Upper Franconia colonized the place. Krásná Lípa belonged to the Tolštejn manor until the 16th century, when it was purchased by the Wartenberg family and joined to Kamenice manor.

John Barnes, an English expert on textile industry, was hired in 1731 to found a spinning factory in the town. In 1731, Krásná Lípa was promoted to a market town by Emperor Charles VI. In 1870, Krásná Lípa became a town.

In 1910, the town proper reached its greatest population with 6,930 inhabitants. The expulsion of Germans in 1945–1946 reduced the population by half and more than 300 deserted houses were demolished, others dilapidated.

Demographics

Sights

The Church of Saint Mary Magdalene is a late Baroque building from 1754, which replaced an old church. In 1777, the tower was built, and in 1816–1818, the extensive staircase in front of the church was built.

The town hall is a Neo-Renaissance building with Art Nouveau elements built in 1899–1900, originally as the seat of the savings bank.

The Bohemian Switzerland House is a tourist information office with an exposition dedicated to Bohemian Switzerland.

The folk architecture in the village of Dlouhý Důl is well preserved and is protected by law as a village monument zone. The houses form a preserved compact set of original mostly half-timbered houses.

Notable people
Anthony Heinrich (1781–1861), composer and violinist
Johann Münzberg (1799–1878), textile manufacturer in Bohemia
Kurt Marschner (1913–1984), operatic tenor
Manfred Preußger (born 1932), German athlete
Gerhard Mitter, (1935–1969), racecar driver

Twin towns – sister cities

Krásná Lípa is twinned with:
 Kottmar, Germany
 Sebnitz, Germany
 Żyrardów, Poland

References

External links

Cities and towns in the Czech Republic
Populated places in Děčín District
Bohemian Switzerland